The Defenders of the Constitution (Ustavobranitelji) was a political regime that achieved power in Serbia in 1842 by overthrowing young Prince Mihailo Obrenović.

History 

Led by Toma Vučić Perišić and later Ilija Garašanin, Serbian Ministers, calling themselves the Defenders of the Constitution, were concerned about the welfare of the Serbian people, but were also obsessed with the increasing power of the state. The acts of the Defenders of the Constitution also foreshadowed the 1848 revolution in the region, when the Hungarians demanded national rights in the Austrian Empire. The Habsburg Dual Monarchy (the Emperor of Austria was also the King of Hungary) denied these national rights to the Hungarians as well as those of other nationalities that occupied the Kingdom of Hungary. This created a war between Hungary and Serbia.

As a matter of government reform, the Defenders wanted better order in their administration. However, they also felt that the people themselves were not intelligent enough or in other words, not possessing the political consciousness or awareness to govern themselves; so it was their belief that the Defenders should teach or administer the people on how to govern themselves without their permission and against their own will.

Politics 
Many of the politics and its bureaucratic foundations were derived from Garašanin and Vučić's childhood idol, the autocrat Francis I, emperor of Austria And Hungary from 1792 to 1806. Both believed strongly in creating an educational system and free elections. These politics were later borrowed and perfected by Jovan Ristić and his liberal government from 1876 to 1880.

References
 
 
 
 
 

1842 in Europe
19th century in Serbia
Political history of Serbia
Political terminology of Serbia
Principality of Serbia